The , Akihabara Radio Hall is a commercial building in Tokyo and is one of the most well-known landmarks in the Akihabara district. The recent building was built in 2014 after the old building was demolished in 2011. The building is 46.5 m high, is ten levels from the ground floor and has two basement levels. The current building primarily hosts stores selling otaku goods.

The old 8-story building was built in November 1962 becoming the first high rise building in Akihabara. The building became the home of electronics shops selling component and parts. After the otaku culture started to establish itself in Akihabara, shops selling otaku goods moved into Radio Kaikan.

Concerns were raised in 2010 regarding the structural integrity of Radio Kaikan due to the building's age. The building was closed for demolition in August 2011 and a new building was built in its place.

In popular culture
 The building plays a prominent role in the Steins;Gate franchise.

See also
 TK-80

References

Rebuilt buildings and structures in Japan
Commercial buildings completed in 1962
Commercial buildings completed in 2014
Akihabara
1962 establishments in Japan
Buildings and structures demolished in 2011
Demolished buildings and structures in Japan
2014 establishments in Japan
Buildings and structures in Chiyoda, Tokyo